Black Pine is an extinct town in Oneida County, in the U.S. state of Idaho. The GNIS classifies it as a populated place.

History
The community took its name from the nearby Black Pine Mountains.

References

Geography of Oneida County, Idaho
Ghost towns in Idaho